The P9T Pistol is a cock-and-shoot spring pistol manufactured by Crosman Airguns. It shoots at velocities up to 275 fps. and includes a 15-round magazine, hop-up propulsion system and an under barrel Weaver rail. It is sold with a holster made from soft cordura fabric and features a Velcro thumb break. Also included in the kit is a trial package of high-quality .12g airsoft BBs.

Specifications 
 Authentic 1:1 scale replica of Walther P99
Fully licensed Walther trademarks (made by Crosman)
Weight: 
Overall length: 
Capacity: 14 round(s)
14-rd magazine
100-rd reservoir
Front Sight: Blade and ramp
Rear Sight: Notch
Scopeable: NO
Powerplant: Spring-piston
Hop-Up: Yes, Fixed
Ammo: 6mm airsoft BB's, .12g BB's suggested
Body: Pistol
Color: Black, Two tone Black and Clear, Brown and Black
Safety : Lever
Action: Repeater, Spring
Package: Plastic clam form
Orange muzzle to comply with federal regulations

References

External links

Images
 8 views from pyramyd air
 from pyramyd air (camo grip)

Air guns of the United States
Airsoft